Nikolay Kirov (born 12 June 1975) is a Bulgarian football manager and former footballer.

Coaching career

Maritsa Plovdiv
Kirov started his career as assistant manager at his hometown club Maritsa Plovdiv. He was soon promoted to manager but in January 2007 became assistant again when the much more experienced Petar Zehtinski was appointed as manager.  However, he resigned in two months and Kirov was restored as manager.

Spartak Plovdiv
On 13 June 2007, Kirov was appointed as manager of Spartak Plovdiv.  He left the club after the 2010–11 season due to the continuing financial crisis.

Botev Plovdiv
On 14 June 2011, Kirov was announced as the head of youth department of Botev Plovdiv, a position he held until 10 January 2017. Kirov served as assistant manager of Velislav Vutsov in 2014 and Ermin Šiljak in 2015.

2016-17

On 1 September 2016, following Nikolay Mitov's short tenure, Kirov was appointed as interim manager – an assignment made permanent in January 2017. His first new signing was Omar Kossoko who joined the club on a free transfer on 29 September. Nikolai Kirov and his assistant manager Ivan Kochev, stabilized and improved the performance of the team. The most memorable and impressive game in 2016 was the tremendous 3–4 away win over Beroe Stara Zagora with spectacular goals by Todor Nedelev, João Paulo and Omar Kossoko.

During the winter break Kirov brought several new key players to Botev Plovdiv: Antonio Vutov, Victor Genev, Ivan Čvorović and Fernando Viana. Lazar Marin returned to the club after a short and unsuccessful stay at CSKA Sofia. In the meantime, due to financial difficulties João Paulo, the most valuable player from the first part of the season, was sold to Ludogorets Razgrad.

With Nikolay Kirov in charge Botev failed to qualify for the championship round playoffs of the Bulgarian First League. However the club finished second in Group A of the relegation rounds and after that defeated Beroe Stara Zagora in the European play-offs. The 7–1 win over PFC Montana from 7 April 2017 is memorable not only as the biggest win during the season but also because the first goal scored by the then 15-year-old Kris Dobrev who become the youngest goalscorer in Bulgarian league history. Under the guidance of Kirov Botev Plovdiv eliminated Neftochimic Burgas, Pirin Blagoevgrad and FC Vereya to reach the Bulgarian Cup final. On 24 May 2017 Kirov lead Botev to a 2–1 victory in the Bulgarian Cup final against Ludogorets winning the club's first trophy in 36 years. Due to the win Botev managed to qualify for the 2017-18 UEFA Europa League.

2017-18
Due to financial difficulties most of the first team players from the previous successful season were sold by the end of 2017. Antonio Vutov decided to join his previous team Levski Sofia for the new season. The goalkeeper Georgi Georgiev was upset for not being in the starting lineup for the Bulgarian Cup final and he left immediately because his contract expired. After winning the Bulgarian Supercup  Victor Genev left to sign with an Israeli club. At the beginning of August Omar Kossoko was sold to Al-Fujairah. A few months later Fernando Viana was also sold. Krum Stoyanov, Yaya Meledje and Tsvetomir Panov left during the winter break.

Kirov had to fill the gaps in his squad and during the summer and the autumn several new players joined on free transfers: Plamen Dimov, Álvaro Juliano, Daniel Kajzer, Steven Petkov, Daudet N'Dongala, and Gustavo Sauer. The start of the season was very successful - on 9 August 2017, Nikolay Kirov and his team won the first Bulgarian Supercup in the history of Botev Plovdiv following a 1–1 draw and a victory through penalty shootout against Ludogorets.

During the winter break Nikolay Kirov brought two ex-players back to Botev Plovdi: João Paulo on a loan until the end of the season and the right-back Filip Filipov. The other new signings were the Brazilian forward Diogo Campos Gomes and the defender Dimitar Pirgov. In the last official home game from the season of First League, 2–0 win over FC Vereya, Kirov made a substitute and allowed Stanislav Shopov to make an official debut for the first-team just at the age of 16. Botev Plovdiv finished 5th in First League and was eliminated by Slavia Sofia at the semi-finals of the Bulgarian Cup after several controversial refereeing decisions.

Honours
 Bulgarian Cup (1): 2016-17
 Bulgarian Supercup (1): 2017
 Bulgarian football manager of the year - Runner-up (2017)

Managerial statistics

References

External links
 
 

1975 births
Living people
Footballers from Plovdiv
Bulgarian footballers
Association football goalkeepers
First Professional Football League (Bulgaria) players
FC Maritsa Plovdiv players
Botev Plovdiv players
PFC Dobrudzha Dobrich players
Bulgarian football managers
Botev Plovdiv managers